In The Spanish Cave (also known as "Captain Long Brown Finger In The Spanish Cave") is the third full-length album by Thin White Rope.

Track listing

Credits
 Guy Kyser – Guitar, Vocals
 Roger Kunkel – Guitar, Vocals
 John Von Feldt – Bass, Vocals
 Jozef Becker – Drums
with
 Mike Conley – Trumpet
 Dave Muller – Trumpet
 Jan Potzmann – Background Vocals
and also
 Paul McKenna – Engineer, Producer
 John Golden – Mastering
 Greg Allen – Photography
 Wendy Sherman – Design

References

1988 albums
Thin White Rope albums
Frontier Records albums